The New Caledonia women's national volleyball team represents New Caledonia in international women's volleyball competitions and friendly matches.

It is one of the dominant teams at the Pacific Games.

References

National women's volleyball teams
Volleyball
Volleyball in New Caledonia
Women's sport in New Caledonia